Imagine Our Love is a studio album by the Los Angeles-based folk band Lavender Diamond. It was released in May 2007 by Matador Records.

Track listing
"Oh No" – 3:47
"Garden Rose" – 5:04
"Open Your Heart" – 3:11
"Side of the Lord" – 2:48
"I'll Never Lie Again" – 3:29
"Dance Until It's Tomorrow" – 6:39
"Like an Arrow" – 4:22
"My Shadow Is a Monday" – 3:24
"Bring Me a Song" – 4:44
"Here Comes One" – 2:57
"Find a Way" – 4:53
"When You Wake for Certain" – 5:36

Bonus tracks
"Oh No" (iTunes bonus track, performed by Colin Meloy) – 3:20

References

2007 albums
Lavender Diamond albums